The Fur Act 1337 (11 Edw. 3, c. 4) was an Act of the Parliament of England passed during the reign of Edward III.

The Act limited the class of people who might wear fur to earls, barons, knights, prelates of the Church of England, and those who expended one hundred pounds at least by the year.

Notes

Acts of the Parliament of England
1330s in law
1337 in England